Thismia hongkongensis is a species of Thismia. S.S.Mar and R.M.K.Saunders, the discoverers, published their discovery in the journal PhytoKeys on 4 February 2015. This species is endemic to Hong Kong.

References

Flora of Hong Kong
Burmanniaceae
Parasitic plants
Plants described in 2015